Jan George Freezen or Johann Georg Freesen, a portrait painter, was born in Palts, near Heidelberg, in 1701. He first studied under Jan van Nikkelen, and afterwards under Philip van Dyk, with whom he became one of the best scholars, and with whom he stayed seven years at the Hague. He was patronized by the Duke of Hesse, and was appointed as the historical and portrait painter at the court of Cassel. He possessed a great knowledge of paintings, which he acquired in Germany, Italy, France, and in the school of Philip van Dyk — an acquisition which was of the greatest use in the establishment of the Cassel Gallery. He died in Cassel in 1775.

Notes

 

1701 births
1775 deaths
18th-century German painters
18th-century German male artists
German male painters
German portrait painters
Court painters
Artists from Heidelberg